The 116th Air Control Squadron is a United States Air Force squadron located at Camp Rilea Armed Forces Training Center near Warrenton/Astoria, Oregon. In March 2011 the 116th departed for a deployment to Qatar. In 2006 the squadron deployed to Kandahar Air Base in support of Air Expeditionary Force 3 and 4, and Operation Enduring Freedom for 120 days. The 116th ACS is a deployable airspace command & control unit, with radar and communications capabilities.

History

116th timeline
Air Control Squadron
Allotted: 24 May 1946 to ANG

Aircraft Control & Warning Squadron (Tactical),
Marietta Army Air Base, Georgia
Sewart Air Force Base, Tennessee
July 1951 – 8 October 1952

Tactical Control Squadron
Portland, Air National Guard Base, Oregon
Relocated: Camp Rilea, Warrenton, Oregon October 1988
9 June 1971 – 1 May 1987

Tactical Control Flight
Portland, Air National Guard Base, Oregon
Relocated: Camp Rilea, Warrenton, Oregon October 1988
1 May 1987 – 16 June 1992

Air Control Squadron
Camp Rilea, Warrenton, Oregon
Redesignated: ACS 16 June 1992
Equipment: MPS-11A, TPS-40, TPS-43E, TPS-75, replacement radar August 1975 due to structural failures.

Deployments
1971 Portland ANG Base, Oregon In-garrison 17 members to Volk Field WI
1972 Portland ANG Base, Oregon In-garrison 15–29 July, Guard Strike IV (Westacs)
1973 Boise, Idaho Sentry Westacs II South of Gowen Field
1974 Portland ANG Base, Oregon In-garrison
1975 Camp Rilea, Warrenton, Oregon
1976 Portland ANG Base, Oregon In-garrison 14–28 Aug
1977 Coyote Lake, Fort Irwin, CA Brave Shield XVI 5–23 July
1978 Camp Rilea, Warrenton, Oregon Taurus Beach 78 5–19 Aug
1979 Camp Rilea, Warrenton, Oregon Taurus Beach 79 7–21 July
1980 North Bend AFS, Oregon Felix Brave 23 Feb – 1 Mar
1980 Camp Rilea, Warrenton, Oregon Taurus Beach III 12–26 July
1981 Camp Rilea, Warrenton, Oregon Felix Keynote 81-4 Sept
1982 Yakima Firing Range, Yakima, Washington Golden Blade 82 1–15 May
1983 Camp Rilea, Warrenton, Oregon Sentry Eagle 83
1984 Portland ANG Base/North Bend ANGS 14–28 July
1985 Kingsley Field/Swan Lake Peak Kingsley Field Deployment 85-1 7–22 Sep
1986 Portland, ANG Base, Oregon Inland Viking 11–27 July
1986 Camp Rilea, Warrenton, Oregon Beaver Hunt 86 17–19 July
1987 Portland ANG Base, Oregon Road Warrior
1988 Camp Rilea, Warrenton, Oregon Beaver Hunt 88
1988 Camp Rilea Unit Relocation October October
1988 Bear River Ridge
1989 Panama Sentry Eagle 89-3 Aug
1989 Pedro Dome, AK Brim Frost 89 18 Jan-4 Feb
1989 Camp Rilea, Warrenton, Oregon Beaver Hunt 89\ 12-17June
1990 Camp Pendelton, California Sentry Eagle 90-3 4–19 Aug
1990 Camp Rilea, Warrenton, Oregon Beaver Hunt 90 June
1990 Laredo, Texas Anchor Mark V Aug −1 Oct (?)
1991 Angie III\ Feb – May 91
1991 Puerta Plata, Dominican Republic
1992 Dominican Republic Angie III
1992 Tonopah, NV Green Flag 92-5
1993 Letica Columbia,
1993 Tonopah, NV Green Flag 93-3
1994 Camp Rilea, Warrenton, Oregon In-garrison
1995 Tonopah, NV Green Flag 95-3
1996 Camp Rilea, Warrenton, Oregon In-garrison
1997 Camp Rilea, Warrenton, Oregon In-garrison/ORI
1998 Italy Operation Deliberate Guard / Determined Falcon May–July (Personnel Only)
1998 Camp Rilea, Warrenton, Oregon Weasel Hunt 98
1999 Camp Rilea, Warrenton, Oregon Sentry West 99
2000 Pedro Dome, AK Cope Thunder, Northern Edge
2000 Jackson, WY Noble Eagle 2000
2001 NAS Whidbey Is. WA Noble Eagle Oct 2001–2002
2001 Nevada Red Flag
2002 Neah Bay, WA & Mt Hebo, OR May (?) – June (?) 2002
2002 Jackson Hole, WY Dec 02 – Jan 03, Operation Noble Eagle "Operation Grinch"
2002 Jackson Hole, WY 2 July 2002 – 9 Sep 2003
2003 Grand Teton National Park, WY Operation Noble Eagle
2004
2005
2006 Afghanistan 6 Sep 2006 – 7 Jan 2007
2007 US/Mexican border Operation JumpStart
2008 US/Mexican border Operation JumpStart, Afghanistan ONE
2009 Iraq OIF Sep 2008 – Feb 2009
2011 Operation Enduring Freedom
2015 Operation Inherent Resolve  May–November  2015
2019 Operation Inherent Resolve  November 2019-June 2020

See also
 Oregon Air National Guard

References

External links
 116th Air Control Squadron

Squadrons of the United States Air National Guard
Military units and formations in Oregon
Air control squadrons of the United States Air Force